Concord station is a Bay Area Rapid Transit (BART) station in Concord, California. The station is located between the downtown business district to the west and residential neighborhoods to the east. Concord station has a single elevated island platform.

History 
The station opened as the eastern terminus station of the BART system on May 21, 1973. The station remained a terminus until the line was extended to North Concord/Martinez station in December 1995 and to Pittsburg/Bay Point station a year later.

A water feature at the station, installed by Stephen De Staebler in 1971 or 1972, was removed in the 1990s.

Bus connections 

Concord is a major terminal for County Connection local bus routes:
 Weekday routes: 10, 11, 14, 15, 16, 17, 19, 20, 28, 91X, 260
 Weekend routes: 310, 311, 314, 315, 320

The station is also served by Tri-Delta Transit route 201 and a special-event shuttle to the Concord Pavilion. Buses stop on the west side of the station; most routes stop at a two-lane busway north of the station entrance, while several routes stop to the south.

Notes

External links 

 BART – Concord

Bay Area Rapid Transit stations in Contra Costa County, California
Railway stations in the United States opened in 1973
Buildings and structures in Concord, California
1973 establishments in California
Stations on the Yellow Line (BART)